Spring Hill was an unincorporated community in Gregg County, Texas. Founded sometime before 1900, the town became the site of many oil field camps during the oil boom of the 1930s. Most oil workers would leave by the end of the decade. By 1940 Spring Hill had a population of 140, a consolidated school district, and a number of businesses. By 1984 the population stood at 1,458 thanks in part to development in nearby Longview. Spring Hill was annexed to Longview on October 7, 1983. Spring Hill still retains its own school district, the Spring Hill Independent School District.

Notes

Unincorporated communities in Gregg County, Texas
Unincorporated communities in Texas